is a Japanese professional footballer who plays for Adelaide United as a striker.

Club career
Born in Nagareyama, Chiba, Ibusuki played all his youth football with Kashiwa Reysol. On 2 January 2009, aged not yet 18, he signed a four-year contract with Spanish club Girona FC. He made his Segunda División debut on 19 April, playing ten minutes in a 0–3 away loss to Hércules CF at the Estadio José Rico Pérez.

Ibusuki spent the following two seasons on loan, with Real Zaragoza B (Tercera División) and CE Sabadell FC (Segunda División B), and made his debut for the latter side in a 0–0 draw against UE Lleida, again as a substitute. He would, however, be a major contributor to the Catalans' promotion to the second level, starting in 26 of the games he appeared in and scoring ten goals, best in the squad.

In summer 2011, Ibusuki joined Sevilla FC of La Liga, but spent the vast majority of his first season with their reserves in the third tier. On 21 January 2012 he made his first-team debut, coming on for Álvaro Negredo in the 83rd minute of a 1–1 away derby draw against Real Betis.

Subsequently, Ibusuki represented K.A.S. Eupen and Valencia CF Mestalla. In 2014 he returned to his homeland, first with Albirex Niigata then JEF United Chiba.

In January 2022, Ibuski signed for A-League Men club Adelaide United. He scored his first goal on debut for the club on 15 January 2022, a day after he signed for the club.

International career
On 17 September 2010, Sabadell announced that Ibusuki had been selected to play for the Japanese under-19 team.

Club statistics

1Includes Copa Federación de España. and Australia Cup
2Includes Segunda División Playoffs, J2 Playoffs and Emperor's Cup.

References

External links
JEF United official profile 

1991 births
Living people
People from Nagareyama
Association football people from Chiba Prefecture
Japanese footballers
Association football forwards
J1 League players
J2 League players
Albirex Niigata players
JEF United Chiba players
Shonan Bellmare players
La Liga players
Segunda División players
Segunda División B players
Tercera División players
A-League Men players
Girona FC players
Real Zaragoza B players
CE Sabadell FC footballers
Sevilla FC players
Sevilla Atlético players
Valencia CF Mestalla footballers
Challenger Pro League players
K.A.S. Eupen players
Shimizu S-Pulse players
Adelaide United FC players
Japanese expatriate footballers
Expatriate footballers in Spain
Expatriate footballers in Belgium
Japanese expatriate sportspeople in Spain
Japanese expatriate sportspeople in Belgium
Japanese expatriate sportspeople in Australia